Little Bay is a port town under construction which is intended to be the future capital of the island of Montserrat, a British Overseas Territory in the Caribbean.  It is adjacent to the town of Brades, where government headquarters are currently located.

History
The official capital of Montserrat at Plymouth, in the south of the island, was abandoned in 1997 after it was buried by the 1995 eruption of the Soufriere Hills volcano. Interim government buildings have since been built at Brades, becoming the political capital in 1998. The move was initially intended to be temporary, but it has remained the island's de facto capital ever since.

The project is funded by the Government of Montserrat and the UK Government's Department for International Development. Following the death in 1997 of Diana, Princess of Wales, the island authorities began the process for seeking approval to name the new capital Port Diana.

In 2012, a plan to construct governmental buildings was decided, and, among other things, a new port is to be built, which should be able to handle ships up to a size of 300 metres. According to the island state, that should also benefit cruise ship traffic. The total cost is estimated to be at least 200 million US dollars, about half of which relates to the port. In 2013, initial work began to prepare the area for construction. In May 2019, construction of the port began. In June 2022, the United Kingdom Caribbean Infrastructure Fund (UKCIF), administrated by the Caribbean Development Bank, granted £28.3m to fund the construction of the harbor.

References

External links
An achievable vision for Little Bay 
Little Bay (New Capital), Montserrat, Caribbean

Populated places in Montserrat
Capitals in the Caribbean
Planned capitals